Linda Schreiber is an American television soap opera writer. Her writing partner was her father Eric Freiwald who died on January 29, 2010.

Positions held
The Young and the Restless: Script Writer (1996–1998; November 2003-February 2004; December 2004-February 2005; November 2005- December 2007; April 2, 2008 – 2013)

Awards
Daytime Emmy Award 
Win, 2006, Best Writing, The Young and The Restleses

Writers Guild Of America Award 
Win, 2005 season, The Young and The Restleses

External links
 

American soap opera writers
Daytime Emmy Award winners
Writers Guild of America Award winners
Year of birth missing (living people)
Living people
Soap opera producers
American television producers
American women television producers
American women television writers
American women screenwriters
Place of birth missing (living people)
Women soap opera writers
21st-century American women